Chathurangam is a 1959 Indian Malayalam-language film, directed by J. D. Thottan. The film stars Prem Nazir and Miss Kumari. The film had musical score by G. Devarajan.

Cast
 Prem Nazir 
 Sathyan
 T. S. Muthaiah 
 Jose Prakash
 P. A. Thomas
 Padmini
 Priyadarsini

References

External links
 

1959 films
1950s Malayalam-language films
Films directed by J. D. Thottan